Arthur Herman Bremer (born August 21, 1950) is an American convicted criminal who attempted to assassinate U.S. Democratic presidential candidate George Wallace on May 15, 1972, in Laurel, Maryland, which left Wallace permanently paralyzed from the waist down. Bremer was found guilty and sentenced to 63 years (53 years after an appeal) in a Maryland prison for the shooting of Wallace and three bystanders. After 35 years of incarceration, Bremer was released from prison on November 9, 2007.

Early life
Bremer was born in Milwaukee, Wisconsin, the third of four sons to William and Sylvia Bremer. He was raised by his working-class parents on the south side of Milwaukee and lived in a dysfunctional household. Bremer stated "I would escape my ugly reality by pretending that I was living with a television family and there was no yelling at home or no one to hit me."

Bremer did not make friends in school, where he was shunned and ostracized. Despite his problems, he graduated from South Division High School in January 1969.

After graduating from high school, Bremer briefly attended Milwaukee Area Technical College, studying aerial photography, art, writing, and psychology, but dropped out after one semester.

Life before assassination plots 
Bremer was employed as a busboy at the Milwaukee Athletic Club from March 1969. In 1971, Bremer was demoted to kitchen work after customers complained that he talked to himself and that "he whistled and marched in tune with music played in the dining room." Angered by his demotion, Bremer complained to the program planner for the Milwaukee Commission on Community Relations. The complaint was investigated and dismissed. Bremer quit his job at the Athletic Club on February 16, 1972.

On September 1, 1970, Bremer got a part-time job working as a janitor at Story Elementary School, which he quit after almost 18 months, on January 31, 1972.

On May 22, 1971, his one known friend, Thomas Neuman, died after accidentally shooting himself in the head with an automatic pistol he believed to be unloaded.

On October 16, 1971, Bremer moved from his parents' house after an argument and moved into a three-room one-bedroom apartment near Marquette University, where he lived until May 9, 1972.

Late on the night of November 18, 1971, Bremer was arrested for carrying a concealed weapon and for parking in a no-parking zone. A court-appointed psychiatrist declared Bremer mentally ill, yet stable enough to continue to live in the community. Bremer was released after paying a $38.50 fine.

On December 8, 1971, Bremer pleaded guilty to disorderly conduct. On January 13, 1972, Bremer went into the Casanova Gun Shop in Milwaukee, and bought a snub-nosed Charter Arms Undercover .38-caliber revolver for $90.

Plans to assassinate Richard Nixon 

After a short relationship ended and he quit both of his jobs, on March 1, 1972, the unemployed Bremer began his An Assassin's Diary with the words "It is my personal plan to assassinate by pistol either Richard Nixon or George Wallace. I intend to shoot one or the other while he attends a campaign rally for the Wisconsin Primary." The following evening, Bremer attended an organizational meeting for Wallace at the Pfister Hotel in Milwaukee.

Although Bremer's main aim was to assassinate then-President Richard Nixon, on March 23 he attended a Wallace dinner and rally at Milwaukee's Red Carpet Airport Inn. Then on April 3, he attended a Wallace victory rally at a Holiday Inn in Milwaukee. On April 8, while preparing for a trip to Ottawa, Canada, Bremer put one of his guns, a Browning 9mm, under a mat in the trunk of his car, but it fell down so deeply into the right wheel well that he could not retrieve it. It was removed a week after Bremer's arrest when the car was dismantled.

On April 10, Bremer traveled from Milwaukee to Ottawa, which Nixon was about to visit. Three days later, dressed in a business suit, wearing sunglasses and with a revolver in his pocket, Bremer went out intending to assassinate Nixon, but could not find an opportunity to do so. Security was tight, making it impossible for Bremer to get close enough to Nixon, and he also doubted whether any bullets would go through the glass of Nixon's limousine. He later returned to Milwaukee, where he remained for most of the following three weeks.

Plans to assassinate George Wallace 
On May 4, 1972, after a ten-day break from writing, Bremer realized it would be almost impossible to assassinate Nixon and decided that it was Wallace's "fate" to be his victim, even though his diary entries never showed the same level of interest or enthusiasm as they did with regard to assassinating Nixon. Bremer made this clear in his diary writing, "He [Wallace] certainly won't be buried with the snobs in Washington. ... I won't even rate a TV interruption in Russia or/Europe when the news breaks—they never heard of Wallace." The following day, he checked out two books from the public library in Milwaukee, both detailing the assassination of Senator Robert F. Kennedy by Sirhan Sirhan: Sirhan by Aziz Shihab and "R.F.K. Must Die!" by Robert Blair Kaiser.

Despite his lack of enthusiasm, early on the morning of May 9, 1972, Bremer took a car ferry to Ludington, Michigan, and visited the Wallace campaign headquarters in Silver Lake, Michigan, and offered to be a volunteer. The evening after that, he attended a Wallace rally in Lansing. Two nights later, he was present at a Wallace rally in Cadillac and stayed overnight at the Reid Hotel in Kalamazoo.

On the afternoon of May 13, Kalamazoo Police received an anonymous phone call saying a suspicious looking person had been sitting in a car near the National Guard Armory. When questioned, Bremer said he was waiting for the Wallace rally to begin and wanted to get a good seat. Bremer was photographed at the rally that evening, where he had a clear opportunity to shoot his target, but according to his diary, he did not do so because he might have shattered some glass and blinded some "stupid 15-year-olds" who stood nearby.

The following day, Bremer set off for Maryland and made his final diary entry.

Shooting
Bremer turned up in Wheaton, Maryland, for Wallace's noon appearance at Wheaton Plaza for a shopping center rally on May 15, 1972. He was dressed in dark glasses; patriotic red, white, and blue, wearing his new campaign button which said "Wallace in '72". He strongly applauded Wallace, in contrast with many others present, who heckled and taunted the speaker. Two tomatoes were thrown at Wallace during the rally, but both missed. Based on this reception, Wallace refused to shake hands with anyone present, denying Bremer the opportunity to carry out his plan.

About 1,000 people were present; they were mostly quiet and it was generally a friendly crowd. After he had finished speaking, Wallace shook hands with some of those present, against the advice of his Secret Service guards. At approximately 4 p.m., Bremer pushed his way forward, aimed his .38 revolver at Wallace's abdomen and opened fire, emptying the weapon before he could be subdued. He hit Wallace four times. Wallace fell back and lost a pint of blood, going into a mild state of shock. One bullet lodged in his spinal cord. The other bullets hit Wallace in the abdomen and chest. Three others present were wounded unintentionally: State Trooper Captain E.C. Dothard, Wallace's personal bodyguard, who was shot in the stomach; Dora Thompson, a campaign volunteer, who was shot in the leg; and Nick Zarvos, a Secret Service agent. Zarvos was shot in the neck, and his speech was severely impaired following the shooting.

Bremer had planned to yell his carefully chosen catchphrase, "A penny for your thoughts!", as he shot Wallace. However, in the heat of the assassination attempt, he forgot to do so. A television cameraman captured footage of the shooting.

Arrest

After emptying his revolver, Bremer was wrestled to the ground and then arrested. Bremer himself was taken to a hospital for treatment of a head wound. Just after midnight, he was arraigned and taken to the Baltimore County Jail, where he was held for the next two months.

After searching Bremer's car, police described it as a "hotel on wheels". In it they found blankets, pillows, a blue steel 9 mm 13-shot Browning Hi-Power semi-automatic pistol, binoculars, a woman's umbrella, a tape recorder, a portable radio with police band, an electric shaver, photographic equipment, a garment bag with several changes of clothes, a toilet kit, a 1972 copy of a Writers' Yearbook, and the two books he had borrowed from the Milwaukee public library ten days earlier.

Seymour Hersh allegations

In a widely noted article, journalist Seymour Hersh claimed that secret recordings of Nixon prove that, within hours of the assassination attempt, the president and a top aide dispatched a political operative, E. Howard Hunt, who rushed to Milwaukee with plans to surreptitiously enter Bremer's apartment and plant the campaign literature of Democratic contender George McGovern. According to Hersh, Hunt aborted the operation because the FBI had sealed off Bremer's apartment prior to his arrival.

However, a 2007 analysis of the Nixon tapes by the History News Network did not turn up any evidence of the clandestine operation described by Hersh. While the tapes did show that Nixon had instructed presidential aide Charles W. Colson to anonymously spread the false rumor that there was "unmistakable evidence" that Bremer had been a "a supporter of McGovern and Kennedy", there was no apparent trace of Nixon tasking subordinates with entering Bremer's apartment to plant Democratic campaign materials.

Trial and conviction

His subsequent trial in Upper Marlboro, Maryland, was condensed to five days and was held only two and a half months after Bremer had shot Wallace, beginning on July 31, 1972.  The defense argued that Bremer had schizophrenia and was legally insane at the time of the shooting, and that he had "no emotional capacity to understand anything." The jury rejected this argument.  Arthur Marshall, for the prosecution, told the court that Bremer, while disturbed and in need of psychiatric help and treatment, knew what he was doing, had been seeking glory, and was still sorry that Wallace had not died.

Jonas Rappeport, the chief psychiatrist for the circuit court in Baltimore, who spent a total of nine hours with Bremer in June 1972 on four occasions, said Bremer had a "schizoid personality disorder with some paranoid and psychopathic features", but also stated that this didn't "substantially impair his capacity to understand the criminality of his actions."

On August 4, 1972, the jury of six men and six women took 95 minutes to reach their verdict. Bremer was sentenced to 63 years in prison for shooting Wallace and three other people. When asked if he had anything to say, Bremer replied, "Well, Mr. Marshall mentioned that he would like society to be protected from someone like me. Looking back on my life I would have liked it if society had protected me from myself. That's all I have to say at this time." The sentence was reduced to 53 years on September 28, 1972, after an appeal. On July 6, 1973, Bremer's second appeal to have the sentence reduced further was rejected.

Aftermath

Although Bremer's actions, arrest, trial and conviction attracted media and public attention, he soon faded into comparative obscurity. As he had predicted in May 1972, he did not reach the level of infamy of Lee Harvey Oswald or John Wilkes Booth, both of whom had assassinated presidents.

A 113-page portion of Bremer's diary was published in 1973 as An Assassin's Diary; it covers the period from April 4, 1972—which, incidentally, was the day on which George McGovern won the Wisconsin primary—to the day before Bremer shot Wallace, leading to his arrest.

On August 26, 1980, an earlier part of Bremer's diary, dated from March 1 to April 3, 1972, (pp. 1–148) was found where he had concealed it, heavily wrapped in a plastic suitcase at the foot of Milwaukee's 27th Street viaduct. In it, Bremer discusses his desire to kill Nixon (Wallace was clearly a secondary target) and fantasizes about killing unnamed individuals who have angered him. He also imagines opening fire at random at the corner of 3rd Street and Wisconsin Avenue downtown. The diary was eventually sold to an official of the University of Alabama at Birmingham, who donated it to UAB's Reynolds Historical Library.

Bremer's assassination attempt did not end Wallace's political career. Wallace was subsequently elected governor of Alabama twice, in 1974 and 1982. However, the result of the assassination attempt, combined with changes in Wallace's personal and general political circumstances, ended Wallace's presidential aspirations. Public concerns over Wallace's health meant he would never gain the momentum he had in the 1972 campaign. He entered the presidential election race in 1976 but withdrew early due to lack of significant support.

Wallace forgave Bremer in August 1995 and wrote to him expressing the hope that the two could get to know each other better. Bremer did not reply (since he was in jail) and Wallace died on September 13, 1998.

Sentence and release

Bremer served his sentence at the Maryland Correctional Institution (MCI-H) in Hagerstown. Bremer was placed in solitary confinement for 30 days after a fight on October 6, 1972. He was reprimanded after another fight in December 1972, and then placed in solitary again for 30 days after a third fight in February 1973. In prison, he declined to receive mental health treatment or evaluation. He worked in the prison library and was described by the chairman of the Maryland Parole Commission, David Blumberg, as "compliant and unobtrusive." He was visited multiple times by his parents before they died.

According to 1997 parole records, psychological testing indicated releasing him would be risky. He argued in his June 1996 hearing that "[s]hooting segregationist dinosaurs wasn't as bad as harming mainstream politicians." Bremer was released from prison on November 9, 2007, at the age of 57, having served 35 years of his original sentence. His probation ends in 2025.

Conditions of his release include electronic monitoring and staying away from elected officials and candidates. He must undergo a mental health evaluation and receive treatment if the state deems it necessary, and may not leave the state without written permission from the state agency that will supervise him until the end of his probation.

In popular culture

In John Waters' 1974 film Female Trouble, runaway-turned-criminal Dawn Davenport when listing her reprehensible conduct claims to have "bought the gun Bremer used to shoot Wallace!"
 Bremer's diary was a primary inspiration for screenwriter Paul Schrader's character Travis Bickle, played by Robert De Niro, in Taxi Driver (1976). In turn, Taxi Driver would be one of the inspirations for John Hinckley Jr. to shoot President Ronald Reagan.
 Peter Gabriel's 1980 song "Family Snapshot" was inspired by Bremer's diary, and describes an assassination attempt (with elements from the shooting of John F. Kennedy) from the assassin's perspective.
 Bremer makes a brief appearance in the 1990 Stephen Sondheim musical Assassins.
A Penny For Your Thoughts is a short animated documentary (2018) illustrating Bremer's assassination attempt. The source material was Arthur Bremer's diary.
Actual film footage of Bremer shooting Wallace is featured briefly in the 1994 drama film Forrest Gump.
Bremer is referenced as having assassinated President Wallace in the alternative future of Stephen King's novel 11/22/63.
In John Frankenheimer's 1995 Emmy and Golden Globes winning film George Wallace, Gary Sinise plays Wallace, and Scott Brantley plays Bremer.

References

External links
 "Wallace Is Shot, Legs Paralyzed; Suspect Seized at Laurel Rally", William Greider, The Washington Post, May 16, 1972
 "George Wallace's Appointment in Laurel", Time, May 29, 1972
 "Bremer case still a riddle because of Judge's haste" (abstract), Michael Olesker, The Baltimore Sun, January 28, 1996
 "The Attempted Assassination of George Wallace", Denise Noe, Crime Magazine, September 14, 2003
 
 "Laurel Shopping Center + George Wallace, 40 years later"

1950 births
Living people
1972 crimes in the United States
American people convicted of attempted murder
American failed assassins
Milwaukee Area Technical College alumni
People from Milwaukee
People paroled from life sentence
People with schizoid personality disorder
Prisoners and detainees of Maryland
George Wallace